Haason Samir Reddick (born September 22, 1994) is an American football outside linebacker for the Philadelphia Eagles of the National Football League (NFL). He played college football at Temple, and was drafted by the Arizona Cardinals in the first round of the 2017 NFL Draft. He has also played for the Carolina Panthers.

Early years
Reddick attended Haddon Heights High School in Haddon Heights, New Jersey. He played safety and running back for the Garnets high school football team. He played in only four games his senior season due to a fractured femur.

College career
Reddick joined the Temple University football team as a walk-on in 2012. He was a running back and safety his freshman year. He redshirted for the 2012 season and saw his first game action in 2013. As a senior in 2016, he was named First-team All-AAC after recording 65 tackles and 10.5 sacks as a defensive end.

Professional career
On November 14, 2016, it was announced that Reddick had accepted his invitation to play in the 2017 Senior Bowl. He was moved to inside linebacker during the Senior Bowl and impressed team representatives and scouts after excelling in practice. On January 28, 2017, Reddick recorded a game-high nine combined tackles, tying Michigan's Ben Gedeon, as he played for Chicago Bears' head coach John Fox's North team that lost 16-15 to the South. His Senior Bowl performance vastly improved his draft stock and made him one of the fastest risers through the draft process, going from an obscure potential top 100 prospect to a top 20 prospect. He received an invitation to NFL Scouting Combine as a defensive end and completed all the required drills. Reddick's 11'1" broad jump was the best among defensive lineman since 2003 and his 4.52 in the 40-yard dash was the best among the defensive lineman at the draft and second-best among linebackers. He also attended Temple's Pro Day and decided to only run the shuttle, three-cone, and do positional drills. Reddick was projected to be a first round pick by NFL draft experts and analysts. He was ranked the best linebacker prospect in the draft by ESPN, the second-best linebacker by Sports Illustrated, ranked the best outside linebacker by NFLDraftScout.com, and the second-best linebacker by NFL media analyst Mike Mayock.

Arizona Cardinals
The Arizona Cardinals selected Reddick in the first round (13th overall) of the 2017 NFL Draft. He was the first linebacker selected in 2017 and one of three Temple players, along with Dion Dawkins and Nate Hairston. Reddick also surpassed Paul Palmer to become Temple's second highest draft pick in history, being behind only John Rienstra who was selected by the Pittsburgh Steelers with the ninth overall pick in the 1986 NFL Draft.

On June 8, 2017, the Arizona Cardinals signed Haason Reddick to a fully guaranteed $13.4 million contract (duration four-year), with a confirmed $7.94 Million signing bonus.

Throughout training camp, Reddick competed for job as the starting inside linebacker against Deone Bucannon, Karlos Dansby and Zaviar Gooden. He played the hybrid inside linebacker position after Bucannon suffered an ankle injury and missed a bulk of training camp. Head coach Bruce Arians named him the backup "money" linebacker behind Bucannon.

He made his professional regular season debut and first career start in the Arizona Cardinals' season-opener at the Detroit Lions and recorded a season-high eight combined tackles in their 35-23 loss. Reddick earned the start after Bucannon was declared inactive due to an ankle injury. His first career tackle came on the Lions' first drive as he tackled Lions' running back Ameer Abdullah after a five-yard run in the first quarter. The following week, he collected seven combined tackles in the Cardinals' 16-13 win against the Indianapolis Colts.
On November 5, 2017, Reddick was ejected for being involved in a skirmish with Carlos Hyde and finished the game with one solo tackle and a half a sack during their 20-10 victory over the San Francisco 49ers. He made his first career sack with Olsen Pierre, tackling quarterback C. J. Beathard in the first quarter. On November 10, Reddick was fined $9,115 for his role in the brawl. During a Week 14 matchup against the Tennessee Titans, Reddick made three combined tackles and made the first solo sack of his career on quarterback Marcus Mariota as the Cardinals' achieved a 12-7 victory.

In 2018, Reddick played in 16 games with 12 starts, finishing third on the team with 80 tackles.

2020 season
On May 3, 2020, the Cardinals declined the fifth-year option on Reddick's contract, making him a free agent in 2021. In Week 6 against the Dallas Cowboys on Monday Night Football, Reddick recorded two sacks on Andy Dalton during the 38–10 win. In Week 14 against the New York Giants, Reddick recorded five sacks and 3 forced fumbles during the 26–7 win. It was an Arizona Cardinals franchise record and brought his season sack total to 10.0.
Reddick was named the NFC Defensive Player of the Week for his performance in Week 14.
In Week 16 against the San Francisco 49ers, Reddick recorded 1.5 sacks on C. J. Beathard, including a strip sack that was recovered by the Cardinals, during the 20–12 loss.

Carolina Panthers

On March 18, 2021, Reddick signed a one-year contract with the Carolina Panthers, reuniting him with head coach Matt Rhule, who coached him at Temple.

Philadelphia Eagles
On March 16, 2022, Reddick signed a three-year, $45 million contract with the Philadelphia Eagles. In Week 3 against the Washington Commanders, Reddick recorded 1.5 sacks including a forced fumble in the 24-8 win. The very next week, Reddick forced two sack-fumbles on Trevor Lawrence in the 29-21 win over the Jaguars, earning NFC Defensive Player of the Week. During the 2022 NFC Championship Game, Reddick recorded 2 sacks and forced a key fumble by San Francisco 49ers quarterback Brock Purdy. Purdy's throwing arm was injured in the process of the strip sack, leading to his inability to throw the ball effectively; this ultimately contributed to the 49ers 31-7 loss to the Eagles. The Eagles reached Super Bowl LVII. In the Super Bowl, Reddick was limited to 1 tackle in the Eagles 38-35 loss to the Kansas City Chiefs.

NFL career statistics

Regular season

Postseason

Personal life
In 2022, Reddick provided vocals on the Christmas album A Philly Special Christmas.

References

External links
 
 Temple Owls bio

1994 births
Living people
Haddon Heights Junior/Senior High School alumni
Players of American football from Camden, New Jersey
American football linebackers
American football defensive ends
Temple Owls football players
People from Haddon Heights, New Jersey
Arizona Cardinals players
Carolina Panthers players
Philadelphia Eagles players
National Conference Pro Bowl players